Pediomelum is a genus of legumes known as Indian breadroots. These are glandular perennial plants with palmately-arranged leaves. They have a main erect stem with inflorescences of blue or purple flowers and produce hairy legume pods containing beanlike seeds. Some species have woody roots while others have starchy tuber-like roots which can be eaten like tuber vegetables such as potatoes or made into flour. Indian breadroots are native to North America. Many species have synonymy with genus Psoralea.

Selected species:
Pediomelum argophyllum - silverleaf Indian breadroot
Pediomelum aromaticum - aromatic Indian breadroot
Pediomelum californicum - California Indian breadroot
Pediomelum canescens - buckroot
Pediomelum castoreum - beaver Indian breadroot
Pediomelum cuspidatum - largebract Indian breadroot
Pediomelum cyphocalyx - turniproot
Pediomelum digitatum - palmleaf Indian breadroot
Pediomelum esculentum - large Indian breadroot
Pediomelum humile - Rydberg's Indian breadroot
Pediomelum hypogaeum - subterranean Indian breadroot
Pediomelum latestipulatum - Texas Plains Indian breadroot
Pediomelum linearifolium - narrowleaf Indian breadroot
Pediomelum megalanthum - intermountain Indian breadroot
Pediomelum mephiticum - skunktop 
Pediomelum pariense - Paria River Indian breadroot
Pediomelum pentaphyllum - small Indian breadroot
Pediomelum reverchonii - rock Indian breadroot
Pediomelum rhombifolium - gulf Indian breadroot
Pediomelum subacaule - Nashville breadroot
Pediomelium tenuiflorum - see under other name Psoralidium tenuiflorum

External links
Jepson Manual Treatment
USDA Plants Profile

Psoraleeae
Fabaceae genera